Sa Jordan Taufua (born 29 January 1992) is a New Zealand rugby union player who plays as a loose forward.

Early career

Born in Otahuhu, in the Auckland suburbs, Taufua was educated at Alfriston College before completing his schooling at Sacred Heart College in the city of Auckland.   After finishing high school, he moved south to Christchurch to attend Lincoln University and while there he played local club rugby for them.

Senior career

Taufua's senior rugby career began in 2012 when he was loaned to the Tasman Mako by Canterbury before the season's commencement. He displayed fine form in his first year of provincial rugby, playing all 10 of the Mako regular season championship games before being controversially recalled by Canterbury ahead of the competition's play off phase.

A full Canterbury squad member in 2013, he was an ever-present as the men from Christchurch retained their ITM Cup Premiership crown, finishing second in the round-robin stage but going on to defeat  29–13 in the final.

He moved back north in 2014 to play for the Pukekohe-based Counties Manukau Steelers and started every game in his first season for them as they finished in 5th place on the Premiership log, just outside the play-off places.   The Steelers were once again agonisingly close to making the play-offs in 2015 but ended up in 5th spot once more with Taufua contributing 3 tries in 9 matches before bagging a career high 6 tries in one season as he was again an ever-present in the Counties side which finally did make the Mitre 10 Cup play-offs in 2016 before they went down to his former side and eventual champions, Canterbury.

After a four-year absence, Jordan Taufua returned to the Tasman Mako in 2017. The Mako went on to reach the Premiership Final that season, which they lost to Canterbury. After Joining Premiership Rugby side Leicester Tigers for the 2019–20 season, he was granted early release in February 2021.

On 27 January 2021, French club Lyon announced that it had signed Taufua as an injury replacement ("joker médical") for the remainder of the 2020-21 Top 14 season for the injured Mathieu Bastareaud and Gillian Galan. Taufua made his Lyon and Top 14 debut on 5 February 2021 against Clermont.

Super Rugby

An excellent debut season for Tasman and Canterbury in provincial rugby brought him to the attention of Christchurch-based Super Rugby franchise, the  who named him in their squad for the 2013 Super Rugby season. Aged just 21 and surrounded by experienced loose forwards such as Richie McCaw, Kieran Read, Matt Todd as well as George and Luke Whitelock it was largely a season of learning for the young Taufua who made just 5 substitute appearances throughout the year.

He was firmly established as a starting member in the Crusaders line up in 2015, playing in all 16 of their games during a season which ended with them in a disappointing 7th place in the overall standings, just outside the play-off positions.

In May 2016, it was announced that Taufua had extended his contract with the Crusaders and would stay with them until at least the end of the 2018 Super Rugby season. Taufua re-signed with the Crusaders for one more season (2019) in March 2018.

International

Although born in New Zealand, Taufua opted to represent the land of his ancestors, Samoa at the 2011 IRB Junior World Championship in Italy before switching his allegiance back to New Zealand in 2012, playing 5 times for them in their run to the tournament final where they went down 22–16 to hosts South Africa in Cape Town.

The following year at Wembley Stadium, on 5 November 2016 he faced the same opposition, but this time in a Barbarians jersey. He was selected as the starting openside flanker in a game which ended up as a 31–31 draw and was replaced by Ruan Ackermann in the 75th minute of the match.

References 

1992 births
Living people
New Zealand rugby union players
New Zealand sportspeople of Samoan descent
Canterbury rugby union players
Tasman rugby union players
Crusaders (rugby union) players
Counties Manukau rugby union players
Rugby union number eights
Rugby union flankers
Rugby union players from Auckland
People educated at Sacred Heart College, Auckland
Barbarian F.C. players
Leicester Tigers players
People educated at Alfriston College
Lyon OU players
New Zealand expatriate sportspeople in England
New Zealand expatriate sportspeople in France
New Zealand expatriate rugby union players
Expatriate rugby union players in England
Expatriate rugby union players in France